Hypercompe turruptianoides is a species of tiger moth first described by Walter Rothschild in 1910. It is found in Brazil (Upper Amazons).

References

Hypercompe
Moths described in 1910